Taoru or Tauru is a town, near Nuh city in Nuh district in the Indian state of Haryana.

History

Fort 

Fort of Taoru, also called Taoru Fort of Raja Nahar Singh, has chambers and rooms surrounded by high walls. It is presently used as a police station.

Taoru Tomb complex 

Taoru Tomb Complex or Tauru Tomb Complex is a  walled tomb complex with 7 tombs, 2 of which has been restored by INTACH and Ansal University's Sushant School of Art and Architecture, of Tuglaq, Lodhi and Mughal architecture. It is rare in Delhi NCR region where multiple architectural styles of different eras are found in one complex itself. The 1828 CE The Imperial Gazetteer of India of East India Company calls this area Lesser Balochistan, a likely reference to arrival of people from Balochistan during Lodhi era who might have been the rulers of Ferozepur Jhirka (a state which exited at least since Lodhi era which was later abolished by the British Raj in 1858 after the Rebellion of 1857) built these tombs during the successive dynasties. The largest tomb belongs to a Baloch. The complex located on Taoru-Sohna section of NH 919 is only  from the Delhi-Jaipur NH48.

Geography
It has an average elevation of 262 metres (859 feet). It is surrounded by Aravalli Range from three sides.

It is reached by road from Dharuhera town of Rewari district that lies on NH 48 and from Sohna town of Gurgaon district. The Rewari-Dharuhera-Bhiwadi-Taoru-Sohna-Palwal road is called National Highway 919 (NH 919). Western Peripheral Expressway to Manesar or Palwal is approx 5 km from Taoru on NH 919.

Demographics
 India census, Taoru had a population of 17,227. Males constitute 53% of the population and females 47%. Taoru has an average literacy rate of 86.5%, higher than the national average of 69.5%: male literacy is 87%, and female literacy is 85%. In Taoru, 17% of the population is under 8 years of age.

Villages in Taoru Tehsil
There are 84 villages in Taoru Tehsil, namely:

Sikharpur, Buraka, Bhajlaka, Silkho, Chila, Sala-ka, Mala-ka, Mohmadpur, Pethredi, Hasanpur, Panchgaon, Chilawli, Charoda, Masit, Dhelamki, Nurpur, Bawla, Mandarka, Nanuka, Kangarka, Subasedi, Bhogipur, Didhara, Nijampur, Kalarpuri, Raniaki, Sewka, Gunawat, Chundika, Sunari, Khoire, Chote Khoire, Rathiwas, Uton, Jaurasi, Jhamwas, Fatepar, Kalwadi, Pada, Sekhpur, Gudha, Gudhi, Subras, Nanduki, Nihalgarh, Gogjaka, Goyla, Kalyaki, Sundh, Bhango, Jafrabad, Beri, Chahalka, Kharak Jalalpur, Khad Khadi, Rahadi, Nai Nangla, Dhulawat, Padheni, Khedki, Baghanki, Kota, Bissar, Sarai, Dadu, Dawla Pati etc.

Schools
There are some private and government-run schools in Taoru. Chandravati Senior Secondary School, Hind High School, Janta High School, Government Senior Secondary School, Green Dales Public School, Spring Daisy Public School. One of these is Mewat Model School Taoru, which is run by Mewat Development Agency with the aim of eradicating various social issues such as poverty and social backwardness in the Mewat region.

See also
 Hassanpur
Mewat
Gurgaon
Sohna
Bhiwadi
Dharuhera
Raniyaki

References

External links 
 http://www.maplandia.com/india/haryana/gurgaon/   by sourabh bansal(S.B.), Chicago
 https://web.archive.org/web/20090410052909/http://secharyana.nic.in/html/PSRESULTPDF/TAORU.pdf  by S.B.
 https://web.archive.org/web/20090410061749/http://secharyana.nic.in/html/MCresultpdf/taoru.pdf  by S.B.
 https://web.archive.org/web/20071107080423/http://haryanatourism.com/pilgrim/surjivanfarm.asp  by S.B.
 elections
 http://heritagetransportmuseum.org/
 Hindustan Times

Cities and towns in Gurgaon district